Sharyn is a given name. Notable people with the name include:

Sharyn Clough (born in 1965), associate professor of philosophy at Oregon State University
Sharyn Ghidella (born in 1968), weekend presenter on Seven News Brisbane and weekend sunrise newsreader
Sharyn Hodgson (born in 1968), Australian actress
Sharyn Maceren, female electro/pop/R&B singer and songwriter
Sharyn McCrumb (born in 1948), American writer on the history and folklore of Appalachia
Sharyn Moffett, American child actor of the 1940s
Sharyn November, American editor of books for children and teenagers
Sharyn O'Halloran, professor of political economics and of international and public affairs at Columbia University, New York City